Askins is a surname. Notable people with the surname include:

Charles Askins (1907–1999), American lawman, US Army officer, and writer
Herbert R. Askins (1898–1982), US Assistant Secretary of the Navy
Jari Askins (born 1953), American judge, lawyer, and politician
Keith Askins (born 1967), American basketball player

See also
W.T. Askins House
Askin, another surname